Katie Spencer is a British set decorator.

Biography
Spencer has been nominated for an Academy Award six times for her set decoration in Joe Wright's films: Pride & Prejudice (2005), Atonement (2007), Anna Karenina (2012), and Darkest Hour (2017), and for the major box office successes such as Guy Ritchie's Sherlock Holmes (2009) and Bill Condon's Beauty and the Beast (2017). She has worked many films and TV series with Sarah Greenwood.

References

External links 

Art directors
Living people
Year of birth missing (living people)
Place of birth missing (living people)
Best Production Design BAFTA Award winners